Ahmad Hassanzadeh (born January 31, 1985) is an Iranian footballer who plays for Saba Qom in the Persian Gulf Pro League.

Club career
Hassanzadeh joined Mes Kerman in 2010 after spending the previous season at Mes Sarcheshme. After Mes Kerman's relegation to the Azadegan League, Hassanzadeh joined Saba Qom with signing a two-year contract.

Assist Goals

International career

He made his debut against Mauritania  in April 2012 under Carlos Queiroz.

Scores and results list Iran's goal tally first.

Honours
Mes Kerman
Hazfi Cup Runner-up (1): 2013–14

References

1985 births
Living people
Mes Sarcheshme players
Sanat Mes Kerman F.C. players
Iranian footballers
Iran international footballers
Persian Gulf Pro League players
Azadegan League players
Association football midfielders
People from Kerman